The apadravya, like the ampallang, is a piercing that passes through the glans. While the ampallang passes horizontally through the glans, the apadravya passes vertically through the glans from top to bottom, almost always placed centrally and passing through the urethra. It can be paired with an ampallang to form the magic cross. Off-center apadravyas are also possible, wherein the piercing is deliberately offset, yet usually still passes through the urethra. The piercing is often done on a slightly forward angle to the hips.

Terminology
Apadravya is the generic name used in Kama Sutra for prostheses to increase the size of penis during intercourse, primarily to satisfy a woman classified as hastini (हस्तिनी, 'she-elephant'). Fixing an apadravya by perforating the lingam is mentioned as a peculiarity of the "southern countries." Such definition is supposedly illustrative of palang (crossbar in Iban) and other penis inserts of proto-Malay origins. Indeed, traditional palang design is simply a pin used to accommodate a wooden glans cape extension and hence, the term apadravya in this context refers to the glans cape extension and not to the palang itself. Nevertheless, it was Doug Malloy in the 1970s who labelled the vertical glans piercing as "apadravya" and the horizontal one as "ampallang."

Procedure
An apadravya is usually done in one session, though sometimes in two; the first creating a Prince Albert and the second (after healing) completing the apadravya. Straight barbells are the usual jewelry for apadravya piercings. The barbell must be long enough to accommodate erection and initial swelling. The apadravya is usually pierced with a slightly longer barbell than required for a fully healed piercing, and downsizing the length can be required. The barbell can also end with the second ball inside the urethra. The diameter of the initial barbell is usually 2.0 or 2.4 mm (12 or 10 gauge).

The healing time of an apadravya piercing can vary greatly depending on healing rate and diligence of the aftercare. Usually one can have penetrative intercourse with a condom after about one month, although the person with the piercing will still feel pain. Normally it takes at least three to nine months for the piercing to fully heal.  After initial healing the piercing can be gradually stretched and larger jewelry can be inserted, reaching sizes above 10 mm in diameter. The piercing should be done in three steps. First a catheter is inserted. Then the needle up from the bottom into the catheter to ensure straightness and that its actually going through the urethra. Then the catheter is removed and the needle pushed up to the top of the glans. Because it passes through the most sensitive part of the penis, the procedure is among the most painful of male genital piercings.

Functions
Apadravya is one of the functional genital piercings; it enhances sexual pleasure. Compared to the more common Prince Albert (and its counterpart Reverse Prince Albert piercing), apadravya has the advantage of stimulating in both rear entry and missionary. It is generally thought of as the most pleasurable for female sexual partners because, compared to Prince Albert, it reportedly allows stimulation of both the G-spot and A-spot in vaginal intercourse. Some men choose to wear special vibrating jewellery during sex, which further enhances pleasure. Sometimes the apadravya is referred to as happydravya because it is said that having sex with a person who has this piercing is highly pleasurable.

Variations
Variations include the shaft apadravya which pierces the shaft (uncommon, and not performed by many piercers); the magic cross which is a combination of the apadravya and the ampallang; and the apadydoe. If the penis has been subincised or meatotomized, the piercing is called a halfadravya.

References

Further reading
 Apadravya: How I Got Stabbed in the Penis, at fullgrownpeople.com

External links 
 "Apadravya" at the BME Encyclopedia
 "Apadravya" at Tribalectic

Penis piercings
Sanskrit words and phrases